Events from the year 1399 in Ireland.

Incumbent
Lord: Richard II (until 29 September), then Henry IV

Events

June–August: Richard II of England’s second expedition to Ireland, with inconclusive results.
Battle of Tragh-Bhaile: forces of the Norman Lordship of Ireland defeat those of Henry O Neill's sons.

Births

Deaths
 4 March – John FitzGerald, 4th Earl of Desmond, drowned.
 Gilla na Naemh Mac Aodhagáin, a professor of Judiciary.

References